Vartiania senganensis is a moth in the family Cossidae. It is found in Iran and Afghanistan.

References

Natural History Museum Lepidoptera generic names catalog

Moths described in 1949
Cossinae